is Japanese for "field of a thousand generations", and  may refer to:

Japanese places
Chiyoda, Gunma, Japan
Chiyoda, Hiroshima, Japan
Chiyoda, Ibaraki, Japan
Chiyoda, Saga, Japan
Chiyoda, Tokyo, a special ward in central (as administrative unit: former) Tokyo City, eastern Tokyo, Japan
Chiyoda, Chiyoda, Tokyo, a district in Chiyoda ward covering the Imperial Palace and the Higashi Gyoen, the publicly accessible East Garden

Japanese naval ships
 (1866), Japan's first domestically built, engine-powered warship
 (1891), a protected cruiser of the Imperial Japanese Navy during the First Sino-Japanese War, Russo-Japanese War and World War I
, a submarine rescue ship of the Japan Maritime Self-Defense Force, commissioned in 1985

Characters
Chiyoda, a character in the game and media franchise Kantai Collection

Others
Chiyoda armored car
Edo Castle or Chiyoda Castle, a flatland castle in Chiyoda, Tokyo, Japan
Chiyoda Corporation, Japan - an engineering contractor in the oil and gas industry.
, a Japanese shoe manufacturer and retailer
Tokyo Metro Chiyoda Line,  a subway line in the Tokyo Metro system
YGCO Chiyoda Station, a Japanese observatory for surveying near-Earth asteroids
Chiyoda, a series of Japanese cars manufactured c.1932-1935 by Tokyo Gas and Electric Engineering Co. (later to become Isuzu)
Chiyoda (camera manufacturer), a former name of the company which later became Minolta
 Momo Chiyoda, a fictional character in the manga The Demon Girl Next Door